Drzetowo-Grabowo is a municipal neighborhood of Szczecin, West Pomeranian Voivodeship, Poland, part of the Śródmieście district and  borders on the north on Północ district. It was formed on the basis of two, historical neighborhoods - Drzetowo and Grabowo. On 2018, the estimated population of Drzetowo-Grabowo was 22,655 residents.

References

See also 
 Szczecin-Drzetowo
 Szczecin-Grabowo

Drzetowo Grabowo